Anak (homophone to a word for "giant, long neck, necklace") is a figure in the Hebrew Bible. His descendants are mentioned in narratives concerning the conquest of Canaan by the Israelites. According to the Book of Numbers, Anak was a forefather of the Anakim. Ten of the twelve Israelite spies described them as very tall descendants of Anak, compare . The text states that the giant stature of the Anakim was the standard by which other giant races were measured, such as the Rephaites, and that Anak was a son of Arba.

Etymology 
L. Nesiolowski-Spano proposed a hypothesis that his name is derived from the Greek 'wanax', 'ruler'.

In the Bible
The Israelite leader Moses sends twelve spies representing the Twelve Tribes of Israel to scout out the land of Canaan. The spies enter from the Negev desert and journey northward through the Judaean hills until they arrive at the brook of Eshcol near Hebron, where reside Sheshai, Ahiman, and Talmai, the sons of Anak. After the scouts have explored the entire land, they bring back samples of the fruit of the land; most notably a gigantic cluster of grapes which requires two men to carry it on a pole between them. The scouts then report to Moses and the congregation, that "the land indeed is a land flowing with milk and honey," but ten of the twelve spies discourage the Israelites from even attempting to possess the land, for they reported that the men were taller and stronger than the Israelites, and moreover the sons of Anak dwell in the land, and that they felt like grasshoppers in their presence.

The Anakites are later mentioned briefly in the books of Deuteronomy, Joshua, and Judges. Caleb, one of the twelve spies sent by Moses into Canaan, later drove out the descendants of Anak — his three sons — from Hebron, also called Kiriath Arba.

Extrabiblical mentions
A woman of a similar name, ʿAnāq bint Ādam, appears as the mother of ʿŪj (the Arabic equivalent of Og) in Islamic tradition.

The Egyptian Execration texts of the Middle Kingdom (2055-1650 BC) mention a list of political enemies in Canaan, and among this list are a group called the "ly Anaq" or people of Anaq. The three rulers of ly Anaq were Erum, Abiyamimu, and Akirum.

Robert Graves, considering the relationship between the Anakites and Philistia, identifies the Anakim with Anax, the giant ruler of the Anactorians in Greek mythology.

Cultural references 
In Herman Melville's 1851 novel Moby-Dick (Chapter 59.  Squid.) narrator Ishmael alludes to "the great Kraken of Bishop Pontoppodan," then concludes the chapter:  "By some naturalists who have vaguely heard rumors of the mysterious creature, here spoken of, it is included among the class of cuttle-fish, to which, indeed, in certain external respects it would seem to belong, but only as the Anak of the tribe."

See also
 Balor
 Laufey

References

Book of Numbers people
Rephaites
Anakim
he:ענק#הענקים במקרא